Kageneckia is a genus of flowering plant in family Rosaceae.

Taxonomic history
Kageneckia, along with Vauquelinia and Lindleya were formerly placed in family Quillajaceae. It shares a base chromosome number of 17 with the pome-fruited members of tribe Maleae within the Rosaceae, but its fruit are dry and dehiscent.

Species
, Plants of the World Online accepted the following species:
 Kageneckia angustifolia, D. Don
 Kageneckia lanceolata, Ruiz & Pav.
 Kageneckia oblonga, Ruiz & Pav.

References

 
Taxonomy articles created by Polbot
Rosaceae genera